The Dacian fortress of Mataraua was a Dacian fortified town, dating from the La Tène culture.  

The ruins of the fortress are located on the right bank of Mostiștea river, across from Mataraua village (a component of Belciugatele commune), in Călărași County, Romania.

References

Mataraua
Historic monuments in Călărași County
La Tène culture